Catherine Rihoit (Born in Caen in 1950) is a French writer.

Portrait de Gabriel, her first novel, appeared in 1977. In 1979, she received the Prix des Deux Magots for Le bal des débutantes. Her 1982 novel La Nuit de Varennes ou l'Impossible n'est pas français was made into a film, That Night in Varennes,  the same year.

Her writing is often on subjects around Roman Catholicism.  She has written biographies of Thérèse of Lisieux (Plon, 1992), Brigitte Bardot (1986), Dalida, and Bernadette Soubirous (2009).

Selected works
1977: Autrement, ailleurs: poems
1978: Le bal des débutantes, Éditions Gallimard, Prix des Deux Magots
1978: Portrait de Gabriel, Gallimard, Prix Contrepoint
1980: Les Abîmes du cœur, Gallimard
1983: Soleil, Gallimard
1986: Brigitte Bardot, un mythe français, 
1988: Retour à Cythère
1992: La petite princesse de Dieu, Plon - (a biography of Thérèse of Lisieux)
1999: La Dame au loup, Stock
2002: La Chambre de feu
2005: Les Maîtres du sens: Bergman, Fassbinder, Lynch, Pasolini, Visconti et quelques autres..., Séguier
2007: Au Bonheur des chats
2009: Dalida: Mon frère tu écriras mes mémoires, Plon - (a biography of Dalida) with collaboration of Orlando
2009: J'ai vu: L'extraordinaire histoire de Bernadette Soubirous, Plon

References 

1950 births
Living people
Prix des Deux Magots winners
Writers from Caen
20th-century French writers
21st-century French writers
French women novelists
French biographers
Women biographers
20th-century French women writers
21st-century French women writers
French women historians